Sir Ambrose Crowley III (1 April 1657/8 – 17 October 1713) was a 17th-century English ironmonger and politician who was returned to the House of Commons in 1713.

Early years

Crowley was the son of Ambrose Crowley II, a Quaker blacksmith in Stourbridge, and Mary Hall and rose Dick Whittington-style to become Sheriff of London for 1706.

He was knighted on 1 January 1706 by Queen Anne.

Career
The Crowley Iron Works at Winlaton, Winlaton Mill, and at Swalwell, all in County Durham were probably, at the time, Europe's biggest industrial location and later, as he was owed so much money by the British Government, Ambrose became a director of the South Sea Company on its formation. Today, he is still known for his enlightened  management methods. His workers had an elected works committee, sickness payments, company medical team and were treated with respect. These rules are set out in the 'Rules of the Crowley Iron'. The main works at Winlaton Mill mainly used imported iron and both iron and steel were worked by the Heyford process. Technologies and skills developed at Winlaton Mill were to lead to the foundation of the Sheffield steel industry and to the ability to machine steel. British iron production was carried out at Ynyscedwyn in South Wales and in the Wealden area of Southern England. The business survived into the Victorian era and the 'Crowley Crew' were renowned for their skills with metal and their steadfast and resolute defence of their rights and freedoms in the face of government intimidation.

In August 1713 he was elected Member of Parliament for Andover but died on 17 October.

Family
Ambrose married Mary Owen, daughter of Charles Owen. They had many children die young. His wife's memorial lists seven children who died as infants. The children that lived to adulthood were as follows: 
John Crowley who married Theodosia Gascoigne
Mary who married Sir James Hallett
Lettice married Sir John Hynde Cotton, 3rd Baronet
Sarah married Humphry Parsons
Anna married Richard Fleming
Elizabeth married Lord St John of Bletsoe.

British comedian and actor Alexander Armstrong is a direct descendant.

Burial
Sir Ambrose was buried at SS Peter and Paul's Church at Mitcham in Surrey where there is a monument with the following inscription:

NEAR THIS PLACE ARE DEPOSITED THE REMAINS OF SIR AMBROSE CROWLEY KNIGHT, CITIZEN AND ALDERMAN OF LONDON, WHOSE NUMEROUS FAMILY AND GREAT ESTATE WERE THE PRESENT REWARDS OF AN IDEFATIGABLE INDUSTRY AND APPLICATION TO BUSINESS, AN UNBLEMISHED PROBITY, AND A SINCERE BELIEF AND PRACTICE OF TRUE CHRISTIANITY, AND PARTICULARLY A BOUNDLESS LIBERALITY TOWARDS THE POOR, MANY HUNDREDS OF WHOM HE CONTINUALLY EMPLOYED.

References

Further reading
 M. W. Flinn, Men of Iron (Edinburgh, 1962).

External links
Crowley's Ironworks Excavation

1658 births
1713 deaths
English businesspeople
Ironmongers
People from Gateshead
Politicians from Tyne and Wear
People from Mitcham
People from Stourbridge
Sheriffs of the City of London
Knights Bachelor